"Hana no Furu Gogo" (Japanese: 花の降る午後, Afternoon When Flowers Fell) is the fifth single by Carlos Toshiki & Omega Tribe released by VAP on September 5, 1989. The song was a commercial tie-up with the 1989 Kadokawa Shoten movie Hana no Furu Gogo, an adaption of the 1988 novel of the same name by Teru Miyamoto. It was the band's last single before transferring from VAP to Warner Pioneer in 1990, as well as their second to last single in their career. It was also the only single to not be included in a soundtrack. The B-side, "Bad Girl," is from the band's album Bad Girl. The single charted at No. 26 on the Oricon chart.

Track listing

Charts

References 

1989 songs
1989 singles
Omega Tribe (Japanese band) songs
Songs written by Tetsuji Hayashi
Songs with lyrics by Masao Urino